Tod Ashley (born November 30, 1965), better known by the stage name Tod A, is an American singer, songwriter, and bass guitarist. He founded the rock music groups Cop Shoot Cop and Firewater.

Ashley also spent time while in art school in a band called Shithäus with Jon Spencer, later of The Blues Explosion.

Ashley was living in Bushwick, Brooklyn when he decided that he wanted to travel the world. In 2005, putting his musical career on hiatus, Tod spent most of the year traveling the Far East, including Calcutta, India and Bangkok, Thailand. He has published a written account of his travels in a blog, which he calls Postcards From the Other Side of the World. He lived in Bali for three years until 2010.

In 2019, Ashley published his first novel, Banging the Monkey based on his experiences abroad.

Discography
Cop Shoot Cop

Firewater

Other appearances

References

External links 
 90.3 WCPN Cleveland – Podcast interview with Tod A.

American male singers
American rock bass guitarists
American male bass guitarists
Songwriters from New Jersey
American industrial musicians
Cop Shoot Cop members
Firewater (band) members
Noise rock musicians
Singers from New Jersey
People from Bushwick, Brooklyn
People from Middlesex County, New Jersey
Living people
1965 births
Guitarists from New Jersey
Guitarists from New York (state)
20th-century American bass guitarists
20th-century American male musicians
American male songwriters